Scrivener's Moon is the third and final book in the Fever Crumb series, the prequel series to the Mortal Engines Quartet. It was released on 4 April 2011.

Background
The story picks off not long after the conclusion of A Web of Air and will once again follow the series' main character Fever Crumb, an ex London engineer.

One of Philip Reeve's blog posts shed some light on the series before its release. Crumb's true journey is set to begin, starting at the newly reconstructed city of London, which has become a fledgling Traction City.

The Arkangelsk return to the series in this book but will be shown in an entirely different light than their descendants who were prominent antagonists in the original Mortal Engines Quartet.

Synopsis
In a future land once known as Britain, nomad tribes are preparing to fight a terrifying enemy - the first-ever mobile city. Before London can launch itself, young engineer Fever Crumb must journey to the wastelands of the North. She seeks the ancient birthplace of the Scriven mutants.

Characters
Fever Crumb
Cluny Morvish
Dr. Gideon Crumb
Wavey Godshawk
Charley Shallow
Nikola Quercus (later Nicholas Quirke)
Nintendo Tharp
Borglum
Gwen Natsworthy
Shrike

Reception 
Scrivener's Moon has a score of 3.97 out of 5 on Goodreads.

Kirkus Reviews called the book "Quiet and somber, but still deeply satisfying".

Thirst for Fantasy praised the book for "introducing some great new characters" in this "character-driven book". It also said any reader who appreciate Mortal Engines would appreciate Scrivener's Moon.

References

External links 

Philip Reeve FAQs
Philip Reeve Blog

Mortal Engines
2011 British novels
Novels by Philip Reeve
Children's science fiction novels
British children's novels
British science fiction novels
British steampunk novels
Predator Cities
2011 children's books
Scholastic Corporation books